The Range Rider is an American Western television series that was first broadcast in syndication from 1951 to 1952. A single lost episode surfaced and was broadcast in 1959. In 1954, the BBC purchased rights to show the program in England. It was also shown in Melbourne, Australia, during the 1950s. It was broadcast in Canada and in Rome (with dialog dubbed in Italian).

ABC ran the program on weekends in 1964-65.

Synopsis
Jock Mahoney, later star of CBS's Yancy Derringer, played the title character in 79 black-and-white half-hour episodes, along with partner Dick West, played by Dick Jones, later star of the syndicated series Buffalo Bill, Jr. The character had no name other than Range Rider. His reputation for fairness, fighting ability, and accuracy with his guns was known far and wide, even by Indians. Mahoney towered over Jones, conveying the idea that Dick West was a youth rather than a full-grown adult.

Stanley Andrews, the first host of the syndicated anthology series, Death Valley Days, appeared in 17 episodes of The Range Rider in different roles, including "Pack Rat" and "Marked for Death" in 1951 and "Marshal from Madero" in 1953. Gregg Barton similarly guest-starred in 16 episodes. Harry Lauter, later a co-star with Willard Parker on CBS's Tales of the Texas Rangers, appeared 11 times, including the episodes "Ten Thousand Reward" and "Dim Trails" (both in 1951), "Ambush in Coyote Canyon" (1952), and "Convict at Large" and "Marshal from Madero" (both in 1953). William Fawcett, prior to NBC's Fury, guest-starred in 9 episodes, including in "Diablo Posse", as Matt Ryan in "Last of the Pony Express", "Dim Trails" (all 1951), and "Shotgun Stage" (1952).

Production
The show was a production of Gene Autry's Flying A Productions, and Autry himself was the executive producer, along with Louis Gray. Producers were Hugh  McCollum and Armand Schaefer. Directors were George Archainbaud, William Berke, Thomas Carr, Wallace Fox, D. Ross Lederman, Frank McDonald, Donald McDougall, and Ray Nazarro.

Mahoney (who was a stunt man before he became an actor) did his own stunt work on the program, which led to his receiving four broken bones and 16 wounds on his head, in addition to being knocked unconscious three times.

The theme was "Home on the Range", though in later episodes, this was played at a fast tempo without the song. The two main characters were the only consistent ones. Five or six names of other actors were given at the end of each episode, but not the parts they played. 

The Range Rider was the first major syndicated program to be broadcast five times a week in many areas, which led CBS Films to sometimes pull episodes from distribution to prevent overexposure. Although the last episode of the show was made in December 1952, reruns continued to be shown, and by 1958 in some markets they were "on their third time around."

Promotion 
CBS owned half of the show and helped to promote it by providing "comprehensive merchandising kits" for use in TV markets. Mahoney promoted the show by making personal appearances on a tour of 20 cities. When he appeared in Pittsburgh, 20,000 children came to see him. 

Mahoney and West performed at rodeos in 1953 in cities such as Philadelphia, where they re-enacted stunts from the program and Oakland, where the fights included "use of real furniture — not the easily collapsed propes used in a majority of movies and TV films." A fight at a stock show in Houston resulted in four broken fingers for Jones and an ankle injury for Manoneyh.

Flying A Productions created a merchandise tie-in by selling buckskin shirts and other items related to the program.

Other guest stars
Jim Bannon  "Stage to Rainbow's End", "The Crooked Fork", and "Marked for Death" (all 1951), and "Badmen of Rimrock" (1953)
Jeanne Bates  "The Black Terror" (1953)
Pamela Blake  "West of Cheyenne" (1953)
Rand Brooks  "Dim Trails" (1951) and "Shotgun Stage" (1952)
Lonnie Burr  then as a child actor, he appeared as Jimmy in the title role of "The Holy Terror" (1953).
Harry Cheshire  five times, including "The Secret Lode" and "Red Jack" (1951) 
Phyllis Coates  twice, including "Pale Horse" (1952)
Steve Conte in "Ten Thousand Reward" (1951)
Gail Davis  twice, including as Ann Carter in "Greed Rides the Range" and in "Outlaw's Double" (both 1952)
Edgar Dearing  "Pack Rat", "Indian Sign", "False Trail", and "The Fatal Bullet" (all 1951)
John Doucette  four times, including "The Border City Affair" (1953)
James Griffith  seven episodes, including "The Flying Arrow" and "Ghost of Poco Loco" (both 1951)
Alan Hale, Jr.  five times, including the episodes "Bad Medicine", "Diablo Posse", and "Last of the Pony Express" (all 1951)
Don C. Harvey  five times, including "The Baron of Broken Bow", "Marked Bullets", and "Red Jack" (all 1951)
Myron Healey  six times, including "Gold Hill" (1952)
Darryl Hickman  in "Fight Town" (1952)
Sherry Jackson  then a child actor in "Dead Man's Shoes" (1951) and "Secret of the Red Raven" (1952)
Brad Johnson   three times, including "The Border City Affair" and "Bullets and Badmen" (1953)
I. Stanford Jolley  twice, including "The Black Terror" and "Hideout" (both 1953) 
Tom Keene  as Lang in "The Grand Fleece" (1951)
Fred Krone  "Convict at Large", "The Buckskin", "The Chase", "Outlaw Territory" (all 1953)
Tom London  "The Hawk" and "Dead Man's Shoes" (both 1951)
Kenneth MacDonald  seven episodes, mostly as a sheriff 
Kermit Maynard  "Sealed Justice" (1951) and "Jimmy the Kid" (1952)
Eve Miller  "Stage To Rainbow's End" and "The Crooked Fork" (both 1951)
Ewing Mitchell  11 episodes, mostly as a law-enforcement officer
Clayton Moore  as Martin Wickett in "Ambush in Coyote Canyon" (1952) and as Dan Meighan in "The Saga of Silver Town" (1953) 
Dennis Moore  "Ten Thousand Reward" (1951)
Jimmy Noel, walk-on parts in five episodes (1952-1953)
J. Pat O'Malley  three times, including "Diablo Posse" (1951)
John M. Pickard  "The Holy Terror" and "The Buckskin" (both 1953) 
Denver Pyle  14 times, including "Six Gun Party", "Gunslinger in Paradise", and "Big Medicine Man" (all 1951)
Mike Ragan  five episodes (1951-1952)
Marshall Reed  "Pack Rat" and "Sealed Justice" (1951)
Gloria Saunders  five episodes
Karen Sharpe  "The Chase" (1953)
Glenn Strange   twice, including the role of Chief Black Cloud in "Indian War Party" (1952) 
Lyle Talbot  four episodes, including "The Secret of Superstition Peak" (1952) and "West of Cheyenne" (1953) 
Gloria Talbott  in "Gold Hill" (1952)
Dub Taylor  three episodes
Minerva Urecal  "Bad Men of Rimrock" and "Outlaw Territory" (both 1953) 
Lee Van Cleef  three times, including as Rocky Hatch in "Greed Rides the Range" (1952) 
Pierre Watkin  twice, including "Blind Canyon" (1952)
Robert J. Wilke  eight episodes, including "Right of Way" (1951)
Gloria Winters  four times, including "Pack Rat", as Sally Roberts in "Ghost of Poco Loco" (both 1951), and "Blind Canyon" (1952)
Sheb Wooley  four times, including "The Treasure of Santa Dolores" and "The Old Timer's Trail" (both 1953), and "Outlaw Pistols" (1953, the series finale)
Chief Yowlachie  twice, "Sealed Justice" and "Big Medicine Man" (1951)

DVD release
In 2006, Timeless Media Group released a licensed two-DVD (Region 1), 10-episode best-of collection. Subsequently, a second licensed set was released, this time consisting of 20 episodes on six DVDs. Between 2005 and 2007, Alpha Home Entertainment released five unlicensed best-of DVDs (region 0), with four episodes on each. Though the series is not actually in the public domain, various episodes also appear in numerous unlicensed budget TV Western DVD collections.

Cultural references
In The A-Team episode When you Comin' Back, Range Rider? (season two, episodes five and six), Murdock is seen watching an episode of The Range Rider in his room at the psychiatric hospital. He adopts the persona of the Range Rider as the team pursues wild mustang rustlers, and is frequently seen wearing a mask of the Range Rider he cut from a cereal box.

References

External links
 

1950s Western (genre) television series
1951 American television series debuts
1953 American television series endings
Black-and-white American television shows
First-run syndicated television programs in the United States
Western (genre) gunfighters